Jotun John Piet Hein (born 19 July 1956) is Professor of Bioinformatics at the Department of Statistics of the University of Oxford and a professorial fellow of University College, Oxford. Hein was previously Director of the Bioinformatics Research Centre at Aarhus University, Denmark.

Hein is the fourth son of Piet Hein, the Danish scientist, mathematician, inventor, designer, author, and poet who wrote the famed Grooks poetry collections and invented the Superegg and the Soma cube. When he was 12 years old, Jotun proved the Soma cube's "Basalt Rock" construction impossible, which was published in the puzzle's instruction manual as "Jotun's Proof."

Hein's research interests are in molecular evolution, molecular population genetics and bioinformatics.

Selected books

 Hein, J; Schierup, M. H., and Wiuf, C. Gene Genealogies, Variation and Evolution – A Primer in Coalescent Theory. Oxford University Press, 2005. .

References

External links
 Personal home page

1956 births
Living people
British statisticians
Fellows of University College, Oxford
20th-century British mathematicians
21st-century British mathematicians